Akshara Gowda (born Harini Gowda in Bangalore, Karnataka) is an Indian actress who has appeared in Tamil, Hindi and Kannada films.

Personal life
In April 2011, Akshara Gowda was linked to Indian cricketer Yuvraj Singh. However, Gowda immediately denied it and said it was mere media imagination.

In a 2017 interview, Gowda spoke about her personal experience of overcoming depression.

Career

Akshara made her debut in the Tamil film Uyarthiru 420 (2011) She played a role in the festival Hindi film Chitkabrey - The Shades of Grey the same year. She also made a special appearance in the  Tamil film  with Vijay in Thuppakki (2012) directed by AR Murugadoss. She made her Bollywood debut in Priyadarshan's Rangrezz in 2013. Gowda appeared in Ajith-Vishnuvardhan's Tamil film Arrambam (2013). She became popular by appearing in "Stylish Thamizhachi" song from the same film Arrambam which eventually became instant hit. She is also featured in films like Irumbu Kuthirai (2014), Bogan (2017), Sangili Bungili Kadhava Thorae (2017) and Maayavan (2017).

Filmography

References

External links
 

https://www.instagram.com/iaksharagowda/?hl=en
Living people
Actresses from Bangalore
Indian film actresses
Actresses in Tamil cinema
Actresses in Hindi cinema
Year of birth missing (living people)
21st-century Indian actresses
Actresses in Kannada cinema
Female models from Bangalore